Suzy Q was a Canadian studio project created by Jerry Cucuzzella. Female vocalists include Michelle Mills and Angie Vileno.    The group is best known for their song "Get on Up and Do It Again" which entered two Billboard charts.

Career
Originally, "Get on Up and Do It Again" was recorded in 1981 with Michelle Mills as the main vocalist and reached number 4 on the Billboard at the end of June Club chart and number 64 on the R&B chart. In December 1981, "With Your Love"/"Tonight" peaked at number 12 on the Billboard Club chart.

In 1985, Suzy Q covered a song "Harmony" which was written by Geoff Bastow and Giorgio Moroder.

In 1986, Suzy Q recorded an Italo-disco/Hi-NRG song and club hit called "Can't Live Without Your Love", peaking at number 19 on the Billboard Club chart, which was written by Giovanni D'Orazio and Antonio Bentivegna.

Between years 1987 and 1989, Suzy Q recorded a couple of eurobeat/hi-NRG songs for J.C. Records, then the group split up.

Discography

Studio albums

Singles

References and notes 

Musical groups established in 1981
Musical groups disestablished in 1989
Musical groups from Montreal
Canadian dance music groups
Canadian girl groups
Eurobeat musicians
Atlantic Records artists